Purity of Diction in English Verse was written by Donald Davie and first published by Chatto & Windus in 1952.  It was Davie's first book, and was followed three years later by a sequel: Articulate Energy.  In 1992 Penguin published both books together in a single volume with a new foreword.  

The book was written for the most part in Plymouth, and Davie put into it much of what he had learned at Cambridge.

1952 non-fiction books
Chatto & Windus books
Debut books
Books about poetry
Books of literary criticism